Cryptolechia aeraria is a moth in the family Depressariidae. It was described by Edward Meyrick in 1910. It is found in India (Assam).

The wingspan is 9–11 mm. The forewings are dark purplish-fuscous, sprinkled with blackish and with some ochreous-yellow scales towards the costa anteriorly. There is a rather broad undefined median fascia of ochreous-yellow irroration and there are some scattered ochreous-yellow scales posteriorly. The hindwings are dark fuscous.

References

Moths described in 1910
Cryptolechia (moth)
Taxa named by Edward Meyrick